Rooney v. North Dakota, was a case in which the Supreme Court of the United States held that the adoption of private execution over public execution after sentence does not violate the Ex post facto clause.

See also 
 List of United States Supreme Court decisions on capital punishment
 John Rooney (murderer)

References

United States Supreme Court cases
1905 in United States case law
United States Supreme Court cases of the Fuller Court